Boulder was an electoral district of the Legislative Assembly in the Australian state of Western Australia from 1901 to 1977.

The district was located in the Goldfields-Esperance region, and was based in the town of Boulder and its suburbs. After the 1961 redistribution, taking effect at the 1962 election, it took in some surrounding country areas.

The district's most famous member was Philip Collier of the Labor Party. Representing Boulder for 43 years, Collier served as Premier of Western Australia from 1924 to 1930, and again from 1933 to 1936.

Members

Election results 

Boulder
Electoral district of Boulder
1901 establishments in Australia
1977 disestablishments in Australia
Constituencies established in 1901
Constituencies disestablished in 1977